Nephrocerus flavicornis is a species of fly in the family Pipunculidae.

Distribution
Europe.

References

Pipunculidae
Insects described in 1844
Diptera of Europe
Taxa named by Johan Wilhelm Zetterstedt